The term Apostolic Letters (Litterae apostolicae in Latin) can designate: 

 The letters of the Apostles to Christian communities or those in authority, i.e. the Pauline Epistles, the Letter to the Hebrews, together with the seven General Epistles of the other Apostles.
 One of the major types of ecclesiastical document issued by the Pope or in his name, the others being Papal Briefs, Papal Bulls, Apostolic Constitutions, Apostolic Exhortations and Papal Rescripts.